Stacy Marie Lentz (born April 17, 1970) is an American lesbian LGBT rights activist, and a co-owner of the Stonewall Inn, and co-founder of the Stonewall Inn Gives Back Initiative. Stonewall Inn is the birthplace of the modern gay rights movements after the 1969 Stonewall riots and forms part of the Stonewall National Monument.

In 1994, Lentz moved from her home state of Kansas to New York, became a recruiter, and later joined a team of investors that saved and reopened the Stonewall Inn, a U.S National Historic Landmark. In New York, Lentz built a career in staffing and recruiting. Lentz has held various leadership positions within the recruiting industry and is currently the CEO of r2 sourcing, her own consulting and recruiting firm. Lentz also served as Vice President for Ajilon Finance, Managing partner of the Lucas Group and a Managing Director at Taylor Grey.

In 2017, Lentz launched The Stonewall Inn Gives Back Initiative, which is "a nonprofit charitable organization inspired by the struggles and ideals of the LGBTQ rights movement born out of the Stonewall Inn Uprising of 1969." The organization provides financial, educational, and strategic help to grassroots organizations that support members of the LGBTQ community. In addition to being a co-founder, Lentz currently serves as President and CEO of the organization.

Stonewall and activism

The Stonewall Inn "is widely considered to be the single most important event leading to the gay liberation movement and the modern fight for gay and lesbian rights in the United States", having been the site of the riots that set off the modern gay rights movement. Lentz stepped in and became a co-partner/investor in 2006 after the Inn had fallen into disrepair, a no-man's-land of crime and drugs that risked closing for good

Lentz and her business partners helped save Stonewall, which many consider to be the most significant gay rights landmark. She also became its first and only lesbian investor, as well as the only gay partner in Stonewall's history. Lentz began using her position for activism by organizing or hosting hundreds of events for GLAAD, Marriage Equality USA, the Hetrick-Martin Institute, HRC, the New York City Anti Violence Project (AVP), Sylvia's Place, Lambda Legal, and others.  In addition, Lentz also helped organize the March for Marriage rally, uniting more than 80 LGBT organizations and thousands of people to call for the repeal of DOMA in 2013.

A few of the highlights in Lentz's activism career include:

 Planning Stonewall Inn's 40th anniversary celebration, marking 40 years since the riots with celebrity guests raising thousands of dollars to benefit the Hetrick Martin Institute home of the Harvey Milk High School in New York City.
 Receiving honors from AVP and HBO and receiving the Community Heroes Award after helping organize a vigil and rally after a gay bashing that received national media attention occurred at the Stonewall inn. 
 Being awarded the Stonewall Community Foundation's Hero Award in 2010 for her activism and work in the LGBT community
 Being listed as one of GO Magazine's "100 Women We Love"
Launching the Stonewall Inn Gives Back Initiative in 2017 to help some of the most marginalized members of the LGBTQ community, especially those who live in areas where they still face daily discrimination.

Lentz also worked closely with GLAAD to ensure that Guinness, one of the major sponsors of New York City's St. Patrick's Day Parade, would be boycotted if they didn't pull their sponsorship from the parade which at that point would not allow LGBT people to march. With the help of the LGBT community Lentz managed to get Guinness to drop their sponsorship and the following year LGBT groups were allowed in the parade.

Due to her activism and involvement at Stonewall and within the gay community at large, multiple outlets have quoted Lentz on her reaction to major LGBT events including DOMA, the overturning of DADT, Obama making history by mentioning Stonewall in his inaugural speech, and President Obama declaring Stonewall National monument in 2016.

As of 2017, Lentz lives in the Meatpacking District in New York City.

References

American LGBT rights activists
1970 births
Living people